Dicroidium odontopteroides was a common and widespread species of Dicroidium known from South Africa, Australia, New Zealand, South America and Antarctica. The species was first discovered in Triassic sediments of Tasmania and described by the palaeontologist John Morris in 1845.

Description 
The leaves of Dicroidium odontopteroides differ from other species of Dicroidium in being unipinnate and having short rounded pinnae.

Whole plant reconstructions 
Dicroidium odontopteroides may have been produced by the same plant as Umkomasia macleanii (ovulate structures) and Pteruchus africanus (pollen organs), based on cuticular similarities between these leaves and reproductive structures at the Umkomaas locality of South Africa.

References

Triassic plants
Pteridospermatophyta